Delina Ann Boshoff-Mortlock, commonly known as Linky Boshoff (born 12 November 1956), is a former professional tennis player who won the 1976 US Open women's doubles title with her partner Ilana Kloss.

In 1973 she won the South African Open doubles title with Ilana Kloss after a victory in the final against Chris Evert and Virginia Wade. In 1977, she won the singles title, defeating Brigitte Cuypers in the final in straight sets.

In December 1975, Boshoff was the first selection in the 1976 World Team Tennis Draft by the San Diego Friars; however, she didn't sign with the team.

In 1976, she won several doubles titles with Kloss, including the German Open, Italian Open and U.S. Clay Court Championships and reached the world No. 1 ranking in doubles.

She retired in 1978 to study computer science at the University of Port Elizabeth. She is married with three children and has continued to play the tennis at a recreational level.

In popular culture
In Snoopy's Tennis Book (Charles Schulz, Henry Holt & Co., 1979), Snoopy imagines himself playing at Wimbledon and claims he had a "good day" at the tournament: "I ate five bowls of strawberries and cream, and fell in love with Linky Boshoff!"

Grand Slam finals

Doubles (1 title)

Mixed doubles (1 runner-up)

References

External links
 
 
 

1956 births
Living people
People from Queenstown, South Africa
South African female tennis players
US Open (tennis) champions
Grand Slam (tennis) champions in women's doubles
White South African people
Sportspeople from the Eastern Cape